Uninvisible is an album by avant-jazz-funk organ trio Medeski, Martin & Wood.

Track listing
All tracks by Medeski Martin & Wood except where noted.

"Uninvisible" – 3:37
"I Wanna Ride You" (Medeski) – 3:28
"Your Name is Snake Anthony" (Hampton, MMW) – 3:12
"Pappy Check" – 2:46
"Take Me Nowhere" – 4:06
"Retirement Song" – 4:47
"Ten Dollar High" – 3:42
"Where Have You Been?" – 3:37
"Reprise" (Medeski) – 0:35
"Nocturnal Transmission" – 6:37
"Smoke" – 2:46
"First Time Long Time" – 2:52
"The Edge of Night" – 3:53
"Off the Table" – 4:15

Performers
John Medeski – keyboards
Billy Martin aka illy B – drums, percussion
Chris Wood – basses
Eddie Bobé – congas, bata, shekere, bottle and bell (tracks 5 and 6)
DJ Olive – turntables (tracks 3 and 14)
Aaron Johnson – trombone (tracks 1 and 10)
Jordan McLean – trumpet, flugelhorn (tracks 1 and 10)
Michael Herbst – baritone saxophone, bass clarinet (tracks 1 and 10)
Stuart D. Bogie – tenor saxophone, contra-alto clarinet (tracks 1 and 10)
Todd Simon – trumpet, flugelhorn (tracks 1 and 10)
Col. Bruce Hampton – vocals (track 3)
DJ P Love - turntables (tracks 4, 6, 7, and 13)
Danny Blume – guitar (tracks 4 and 14), baritone guitar (track 4), ambient guitar (tracks 6 and 10)
Brad Roberts – vocals (track 8)
Scotty Hard – Nomad Rhythm Maker (tracks 5 and 13), rhythm guitar (track 6), turntables (track 12), feedback (track 3)

Credits
Produced and engineered by Scotty Hard
Additional engineering by Greg Griffiths at Shacklyn
Mastered by Howie Weinberg at Masterdisk NYC
Assembled, edited, and tweaked by Mike Fossenkemper at Turtle Tone Studios, Englewood, NJ
Assisted by Juan Garcia and Tom Camuso at The Magic Shop
Assisted by Philip Harvey at Shacklyn
Assisted by Jeff Jakubowski at Bearsville Studios

References

2002 albums
Blue Note Records albums
Medeski Martin & Wood albums